Night Crossing is a 1982 British-American thriller drama film starring John Hurt, Jane Alexander and Beau Bridges. The film is based on the true story of the Strelzyk and Wetzel families, who on September 16, 1979, attempted to escape from East Germany to West Germany in a homemade hot air balloon, during the days of the Inner German border-era, when immigration to West Germany was strictly prohibited by the East German government. It was the final theatrical film directed by Delbert Mann, and the last film, too, in which Kay Walsh appeared, before retiring.

Plot

The film opens with a brief summary of 1961's then-current conditions in East Germany and nature of the border zone, featuring stock footage such as Conrad Schumann's jump over barbed wire in Berlin as the Berlin Wall is being built.

In April 1978, in the small town of Pößneck, Thuringia, a teenager, Lukas Keller, attempts to escape East Germany by riding a bulldozer through the Inner German Border Zone. However, he is shot by automatic machine guns and left for dead by the guards; his family is informed while having a picnic with their friends, the Strelzyks and the Wetzels, and the entire Keller family are taken away by the police. Finally fed up with his life under the GDR regime, Peter Strelzyk proposes a daring plan to his friend Günter Wetzel: they will build a balloon to carry themselves and their families (eight people total) over the border to West Germany. They purchase 1,255 square yards of taffeta (claiming it is for a camping club); Günter sews the fabric together with a sewing machine in his attic and Peter experiments for months to construct a hot air balloon burner. Of course, they face setbacks: fires while trying to inflate the balloon, struggles to build a burner with sufficient power, extremely suspicious neighbors, and doubts about the plan's workability from Günter's wife, Petra.

Eventually, Peter and Günter then stop seeing each other, to avoid suspicion for when the Strelzyks escape. Peter and his eldest son, Frank, complete the burner and, after extensive testing, manage to inflate the balloon. On July 3, 1979, the four members of the Strelzyk family attempt to fly out. They successfully take off, though they are spotted by the border guard (who do not know what to make of it); however, a cloud dampens the balloon and the burner, and they crash within the border zone, only a few hundred feet from the fences, and the balloon floats away. Miraculously, they escape the zone, return to their car and drive home. Meanwhile, the border guard finds the balloon and the Stasi, led by Major Koerner (played by Günter Meisner), begins an investigation to find whoever built it, so they can prevent them from trying again. Initially distraught over his failure, Peter is convinced by his sons to try again, as they did fly and no one was hurt, and now the Stasi will stop at nothing to find them. Peter convinces Günter to help him and both families begin work on a larger balloon to carry them all out. Petra agrees to go with the plan, especially since her mother in West Berlin is very sick and the East German government has once again denied her request to visit her.

Having identified the initial launch area, the Stasi begins closing in on Pößneck. The Strelzyks and Wetzels purchase smaller quantities of taffeta from various stores to avoid suspicion, but they are running out of time. In one scene, Peter tries to buy taffeta, claiming it is for his group of Young Pioneers; the manager leaves him to notify the Stasi, prompting Peter to leave the store. They eventually finish the balloon, but have no time to test it. On September 15, 1979, the families prepare to move out while the Stasi finds blood pressure medicine belonging to Peter's wife, Doris, at the place where the first balloon initially landed. They contact the pharmacy and run through all the people whom the medicine is prescribed to, eventually coming to Doris. Their neighbor (a member of the Stasi) identifies them as acting suspiciously; the families leave only minutes before the Stasi arrives at their homes. They reach their launch point while the border is placed on emergency alert.

The balloon is inflated and the burner is lit. Both families climb into the balloon's basket and cut their ropes. A fire is started in the cloth, but it is quickly put out by Günter and they later see a hole in the balloon and hope it will hold. As they fly over, the balloon is spotted and Koerner pursues them in a helicopter. Eventually, the burner runs out of propane and they descend; the border guard is mobilized to find them. The balloon lands in a clearing, with all eight people unharmed. Peter and Günter scout to find out where they are. They are found by a police car. Peter asks if they are in the West; puzzled, the police officer says "Of course you are". Overjoyed, Peter and Günter light their signal flare. The families all then happily embrace each other over the amazing success of their journey.

Cast
John Hurt as Peter Strelzyk
Doug McKeon as Frank Strelzyk
Keith McKeon as Fitscher Strelzyk 
Beau Bridges as Günter Wetzel
Jane Alexander as Doris Strelzyk
Glynnis O'Connor as Petra Wetzel
Klaus Löwitsch as Schmolk
Geoffrey Liesik as Peter Wetzel
Michael Liesik as Andreas Wetzel
Ian Bannen as Josef Keller
Anne Stallybrass as Magda Keller
Matthew Taylor as Lukas Keller
Günter Meisner as Major Koerner
Sky Dumont as Ziegler
Jan Niklas as Lieutenant Fehler
Kay Walsh as Doris' Mother

Production
The wife of Walt Disney Productions producer Tom Leetch discovered a 17 Sep 1979 front page newspaper story in The Times (London), reporting the real-life balloon escape of the Strelzyk and Wetzel families from East Germany the previous day. After Leetch showed the clipping to Disney’s vice president of production and executive producer, Ron Miller, Eva Redfern of the studio’s office in London, England, contacted the two families to discuss the possibility creating a film about them. Less than a month later, Redfern met with Peter Strelzyk at the Hotel Atlantic in Hamburg, Germany. Although the families received five offers from other filmmakers, they accepted Disney’s terms—a $5,000 six-month story option and $50,000 if the studio moved ahead with development—because they remembered watching Disney films through illicit television signals in their home in East Germany; in addition, they hoped the film would educate people when it was eventually shown in their home country. The week of 19 Nov 1979, the Strelzyks and the Wetzels traveled to Los Angeles, CA, where they recorded twenty hours of interviews for Leetch, associate producer Marc Stirdivant, and writer John McGreevey. At this time, the film was referred to by an unofficial working title, The Balloon Movie. Filming was scheduled to begin 1 Sep 1980 in Munich, Germany, but an eight-week Screen Actors Guild (SAG) strike delayed production until 27 Oct 1980. Production notes in AMPAS library files listed the German cities of Landsberg, Mühltal, Harthausen, and Munich among the filming locations. In the town of Eulenschwang, the production team recreated a $300,000, half-mile section of the border between East and West Germany. Near Lake Constance in Friedrichschafen, Germany, filmmakers transplanted 300 pine trees, 150 cubic yards of soil, and 6,000 square yards of black plastic to transform a large fair exhibition hall into a contained forest set. The construction project took two weeks and cost $150,000. Additional interior filming took place at Munich’s Bavaria Studios. Glendale, CA’s Balloon Ventures, Inc., owner, Gary Cerveny, created seven balloons for the picture, six of which were authentic recreations of the Strelzyk and Wetzel’s actual balloon, with material and technical changes made to appease Federal Aeronautic Administration regulations. The remaining balloon was a smaller utility aircraft used for preliminary tests and aerial photography. One balloon reportedly required 12,453 square feet of material. The 25 Feb 1981 Var reported that unexpected snowfall caused delays during the final week of filming, and production completed the week of 18 Jan 1981, at least a week behind and over budget. The final cost was estimated at more than $10 million.

Production notes

The German title Mit dem Wind nach Westen translates as "With the Wind to the West", although the families' actual flight path, from Pößneck in Thuringia to Naila, near Hof in Bavaria, did not take them west geographically, but almost due south. Nevertheless in the GDR-terminology "Federal Republic of Germany" was always considered as "The West", no matter if it is geographically in the north, the west or the south of the respective region. 
The license plates on the cars in the movie used the correct East German numbering system but were pressed on West German blanks using West German DIN-standard dies. Such plates were issued briefly, but not until after German reunification, thus creating an unintended and ironic anachronism.
John Hurt was approached on set to lend his voice for Disney's then-upcoming animated feature The Black Cauldron as the Horned King.
The movie was filmed on location in Bavaria.
The film was nominated for two Young Artist Awards — Best Family Picture and Best Young Actor (Doug McKeon)
Jürgen Petschull's 1980 non-fiction book With the Wind to the West was republished as a tie-in to the film's release that same year.
The film went through several working titles including The Balloon Movie, The Last Flight to Freedom and Wind to the West.

References

External links
  (archived)
 
 
 

1982 films
1980s American films
1980s British films
1980s English-language films
1980s historical drama films
American aviation films
American historical drama films
American thriller drama films
British historical drama films
British thriller drama films
Balloons (aeronautics)
Cold War films
Drama films based on actual events
Films about the Berlin Wall
Films about families
Films critical of communism
Films directed by Delbert Mann
Films scored by Jerry Goldsmith
Films set in 1978
Films set in 1979
Films set in East Germany
Films shot in Germany
Walt Disney Pictures films